Andrew Varick Stout Anthony (1835, in New York City – 1906) was a United States wood engraver.

Biography
Anthony was the son of Eliza (Stout) and John Anthony. He studied drawing and engraving under the best teachers in New York, and was one of the original members of the American Water Color Society. He passed part of his professional life in New York and California, but settled in Boston in 1878.

He was married to Mary Aurelia (Walker). His grandson was actor Osgood Perkins, his great-grandson was actor Anthony Perkins, and his great-great-grandson is actor Oz Perkins.

Works

His most conspicuous success was achieved as a line engraver. Among his best known works are the illustrations for John Greenleaf Whittier's Snow-Bound (1867), Ballads of New England (1870), and Mabel Martin (1876); Henry Wadsworth Longfellow's Skeleton in Armor (1877), and Nathaniel Hawthorne's The Scarlet Letter (1878). The illustrated edition of Geraldine (a " romance" written by Alphonso A. Hopkins in 1881) was published in 1887 with illustrations "drawn, engraved, and printed under the supervision of A.V.S. Anthony." It is a particularly interesting edition because the illustrations are not only demonstrative of the themes, but are accurate drawings of sites and features along the St. Lawrence River.

Notes

References

Further reading

External links
 
 

1835 births
1906 deaths
American engravers
American illustrators
Artists from Boston
Artists from New York City